Arthur John Burns (22 October 1830 – 15 September 1901) was a prominent early settler of Otago, New Zealand, a member of the Otago Provincial Council, a member of the New Zealand House of Representatives and founder of the Mosgiel Woollen Company, Dunedin.

Biography

Burns was born in Monkton, South Ayrshire, Scotland. He was the only son and eldest child of Thomas Burns and Clementina Grant and the great-nephew of the poet Robert Burns. He came to Otago with his father in the Philip Laing arriving in Port Chalmers on 15 April 1848.

He played a prominent part in provincial affairs and was a member of the Provincial Council from 1855 to 1859 and again from 1863 to 1870. On three occasions, he served on the Executive Council of the Otago Province. He was also a member of the New Zealand House of Representatives on three occasions; Bruce 1865–1866, Caversham 1866–1870 when he resigned, and Roslyn 1875–1878 when he resigned. He vigorously opposed the abolition of the provinces in 1876.

On 6 April 1861 he married Sarah Scott Dickson, with whom he had 11 children.

He founded the Mosgiel Woollen Company in 1871 in an area on the western outskirts of Dunedin. Burns named the town Mosgiel after his great-uncle Robert Burns's Mossgiel farm in Ayrshire, Scotland. He imported skilled labour and specialised equipment from Great Britain to begin large scale clothmaking in 1873. This mill formed the backbone of the Mosgiel economy for decades.

Burns died on 15 September 1901 and is memorialised in the names of two schools – Arthur Burns School in Mosgiel and the Arthur Burns Early Learning Centre. Arthur Burns School in Mosgiel has since been amalgamated with two other primary schools in the region. Burns Point and Arthurs Walk in Vauxhall are named after Burns, who lived on the site of the current White House.

Notes

References

External links
Arthur Burns' Mosgiel Woollen Mills – a view from Rentons Road circa 1875 by John Toomer, 2005
Ram's Head snuff mull from the Otago Settlers Museum

People from Mosgiel
Members of the Otago Provincial Council
Members of the New Zealand House of Representatives
1830 births
1901 deaths
New Zealand people of Scottish descent
New Zealand MPs for Dunedin electorates
Burials at Dunedin Southern Cemetery
Unsuccessful candidates in the 1890 New Zealand general election
Members of Otago provincial executive councils
19th-century New Zealand politicians
19th-century New Zealand businesspeople
Arthur John